Malek Talesh (also Romanized as Malek Ţālesh; also known as Malek, Molk, and Mulk) is a village in Sina Rural District, in the Central District of Varzaqan County, East Azerbaijan Province, Iran. At the 2015 census, its population was 167, in 53 families.

References 

Towns and villages in Varzaqan County